Mace Group Ltd, commonly known as Mace, is a global consultancy and construction firm headquartered in London, United Kingdom, employing approximately 5,000 people, across five continents with a turnover in excess of £2 billion.

History
The company was founded by a group of construction and architecture professionals, led by Ian Macpherson, who left Bovis in 1990 hoping to bring in some new, more collaborative ways of working in the traditionally combative construction industry.

The Mace startup team got its first break in 1997 when it beat Bovis and was appointed as project and construction manager on British Airways' Waterside headquarters at Heathrow. The company went on to deliver the London Eye on the South Bank and The Venetian in Macau. In early 2009 Mace was appointed to deliver the fixed price The Shard tower above London Bridge station.

Mace rebranded in 2008, becoming Mace Group, expanding its service offers, spanning consultancy services and construction across the entire property life cycle.

Operations
Mace's activities involve the following:
 Programme and project management
 Cost consultancy
 Construction delivery
 Facilities management
 Additional services (including health and safety management, sustainability consultancy, contracts and dispute management, social inclusion programmes, investment and Building Information Modelling (BIM), supply chain training and site logistics)

Major projects
Major projects involving Mace have included:
 The London Eye completed in 2000
 The Venetian in Macau completed in 2007
 The Emirates Air Line completed in 2012
 The Shard at London Bridge completed in 2012
 The Tottenham Hotspur Stadium completed in 2019
The NHS Nightingale Hospital London completed in 2020 in response to the Covid-19 Pandemic

References

Companies based in the City of London
British companies established in 1990
Construction and civil engineering companies of the United Kingdom
Construction and civil engineering companies established in 1990